The 1952 NC State Wolfpack football team represented North Carolina State University during the 1952 college football season. The Wolfpack were led by first-year head coach Horace Hendrickson and played their home games at Riddick Stadium in Raleigh, North Carolina. They competed as members of the Southern Conference for the final year before joining six other larger SoCon schools in creating the Atlantic Coast Conference in 1953.

Schedule

References

NC State
NC State Wolfpack football seasons
NC State Wolfpack football